Semioptila constans is a moth in the Himantopteridae family. It was described by Erich Martin Hering in 1937. It is found in Tanzania.

References

Moths described in 1937
Himantopteridae